Slavko Lukanc (born 30 July 1921, date of death unknown) was a Slovenian alpine skier. He competed in two events at the 1948 Winter Olympics, representing Yugoslavia.

References

External links
 

1921 births
Year of death missing
Slovenian male alpine skiers
Olympic alpine skiers of Yugoslavia
Alpine skiers at the 1948 Winter Olympics
People from Tržič